The Buffalo Forge Company was formed in 1878 to manufacture blacksmith’s forges. Their product offerings were expanded to include drilling machines in 1883, and steam engines and pumps in 1889.

History

Air Conditioning

In 1902, Willis Carrier, an engineer at Buffalo Forge, submitted drawings for what became recognized as the world's first modern air conditioning system. In 1915, he left the company to form Carrier Engineering Corporation.

Other products
Heating equipment, dust collectors, and a range of metal cutting and forming equipment were also manufactured by the company. In addition to being one of the largest employers in the city of Buffalo (during its heyday), Buffalo Forge operated several other plants in the United States, Canada, and Mexico. The Wendt family retained ownership of the company until 1941, when the ownership was broadened by a public stock offering. Buffalo Forge was one of the "big three" that made blacksmith equipment in the United States. Champion and Canedy-Otto companies were the other domestic competition.

Mergers, acquisitions & significant events

References

Heating, ventilation, and air conditioning companies
Manufacturing companies based in Buffalo, New York